The Heidenfeld Trophy is chess league competition in Leinster, Ireland, it is the second division of the Leinster Chess Union. Founded in 1971 with the restructuring of the division one Armstrong Cup it was named after the famous German born chess player and former Irish Champion Wolfgang Heidenfeld. The league comprises twelve teams, of eight players on each team, with the top two teams each season are promoted to the Armstrong Cup, with the bottom two teams relegated to the third division Ennis Shield.
Players have to be registered with the Irish Chess Union, all matches are rated by the ICU, and in 2010 for the first time matches were graded by FIDE.

Winners
 1971 - St. Columbas
 1972 - Dublin
 1974 - Kevin Barry
 1975 - Portmarnock
 1976 - Printers
 1977 - Collegians
 1978 - Yellow House, Rathfarnham
 1979 - Sandymount
 1980 - Dublin University
 1981 - Carlow
 1982 - Kevin Barry
 1983 - Malahide
 1984 - Elm Mount
 1985 - Dalkey Grange
 1986 - Rathmines 
 1987 - Skerries
 1988 - Ballyfermot
 1989 - Skerries
 1990 - Gonzaga
 1991 - Elm Mount
 1992 - Phibsboro
 1993 - Rathfarnham
 1994 - Gonzaga
 1995 - St. Benlidus
 1996 - Bray/Greystones
 1997 - Kilkenny
 1998 - Rathmines A
 1999 - Dublin 
 2000 - Rathfarnham/Tallaght
 2002 - Dun Laoghaire
 2003 - Rathmines
 2004 - Elm Mount A
 2005 - Rathmines
 2006 - Dublin University
 2007 - Rathmines
 2008 - Bray/Greystones A
 2009 - Celbridge
 2010 - Malahide
 2011 - Elm Mount
 2012 - Dun Laoghaire
 2013 - Celbridge
 2014 - Elm Mount
 2015 - Curragh 
 2016 - Rathmines B
 2017 - St. Benildus
 2018 - Gonzaga
 2019 - Ballinasloe

References

Chess in Ireland
1971 in chess
Recurring sporting events established in 1971
1971 establishments in Ireland